HMS Satyr was an  destroyer which served with the Royal Navy during the First World War. Launched on 27 December 1916, Satyr joined the Harwich Force under the command of Commander Hubert de Burgh. After the war, the ship served with the Torpedo School at the Devonport. In 1923, the Navy decided to retire many of the older destroyers in preparation for the introduction of newer and larger vessels and Satyr was sold to be broken up on 16 December 1926.

Design and development
Satyr was one of ten  destroyers ordered by the British Admiralty in December 1915 as part of the Seventh War Construction Programme. The design was generally similar to the preceding  destroyers, but differed in having geared steam turbines, the central gun mounted differently and minor changes to improve seakeeping.

Three funnels were fitted.

Armament consisted of three QF 4in Mk IV guns on the ship's centreline, with one on the forecastle, one aft on a raised platform and one between the second and third funnels. A single 2-pounder (40 mm) pom-pom anti-aircraft gun was carried, while torpedo armament consisted of two twin rotating mounts for  torpedoes. The ship had a complement of 82 officers and ratings.

Construction and career
Satyr was laid down at the William Beardmore and Company shipyard in Dalmuir during April 1916 with yard number 549, launched in December 1916 and completed on 2 February 1917. The destroyer cost £150,103 to build. On commissioning, Satyr joined the 10th Destroyer Flotilla of the Harwich Force. The commanding officer was Commander Hubert de Burgh.

De Burgh received the Distinguished Service Order for his part in the action, particularly for saving the lives of seven of the crew of S20 while under fire.

Satyr remained part of the 10th Destroyer Flotilla at the end of the war, but by February 1919, had been transferred to the Torpedo School at the Devonport. In 1923, the Navy decided to scrap many of the older destroyers in preparation for the introduction of newer and larger vessels. Satyr was one of those chosen to retire and was sold to Thos. W. Ward of Milford Haven on 16 December 1926 and broken up.

Pennant numbers

References

Citations

Bibliography

 
 
 
 
 
 
 
 
 
 

1916 ships
Ships built on the River Clyde
R-class destroyers (1916)
World War I destroyers of the United Kingdom